The Naccache–Stern cryptosystem is a homomorphic public-key cryptosystem whose security rests on the higher residuosity problem. The Naccache–Stern cryptosystem was discovered by David Naccache and Jacques Stern in 1998.

Scheme Definition

Like many public key cryptosystems, this scheme works in the group  where n is a product of two large primes. This scheme is homomorphic and hence malleable.

Key Generation

Pick a family of k small distinct primes p1,...,pk.
Set 
Choose large primes a and b such that both p = 2au+1 and q=2bv+1 are prime.
Set n=pq.
Choose a random g mod n such that g has order φ(n)/4.

The public key is the numbers σ,n,g and the private key is the pair p,q.

When k=1 this is essentially the Benaloh cryptosystem.

Message Encryption
This system allows encryption of a message m in the group .

Pick a random .
Calculate 

Then E(m) is an encryption of the message m.

Message Decryption

To decrypt, we first find m mod pi for each i, and then we apply the Chinese remainder theorem to calculate m mod .

Given a ciphertext c, to decrypt, we calculate

.  Thus

where .
Once mi is known for each i, m can be recovered by a direct application of the Chinese remainder theorem.

Security
The semantic security of the Naccache–Stern cryptosystem rests on an extension of the quadratic residuosity problem known as the higher residuosity problem.

References

Public-key encryption schemes